Élisabeth Margoni (born 16 January 1945) is a French actress. She appeared in more than seventy films since 1968.

Theater

Filmography

References

External links
 

1945 births
Living people
People from Mantes-la-Jolie
French film actresses
French television actresses